The Standard is a 4 stroke aircraft engine for Homebuilt aircraft

Design and development
The engine is based on the Corvair engine. It is extensively modified for aircraft use. This modification consists of an IFB Internal front bearing modification to take forward loads.

Applications
Sonex Aircraft Sonex

Specifications (variant)

See also

References

Aircraft piston engines